"Gigolo" is a dance single written and produced by Fonce and Larry Mizell and released by R&B singer Mary Wells on the Epic Records label. It was the former Motown star's first single with the CBS-operated label and brought Wells brief renewed success on the Billboard chart.

Overview

Return from retirement
After leaving Motown Records in 1964, Mary Wells struggled to produce hits outside of the label only achieving once with "Use Your Head" on 20th Century Fox though she continued to score top 40 hits on the R&B chart in the late sixties and early seventies. By 1974, however, after the Bobby Womack-produced "If You Can't Give Her Love" single flopped on Reprise, Wells reluctantly retired to raise her four children that she had with second husband, musician Cecil Womack. The couple divorced in 1977 and after being offered a deal with Epic Records in 1981, she returned to the studio to record her first album in thirteen years, In and Out of Love. Among the singles was "Gigolo", a funky dance hit with the then-current sound mixing dance beats with funky riffs. The song talks about a man who only loves a girl for one night before moving to the next woman. The narrator contends she knew that her lover "wasn't going to stay" but assures that the man was "such a gentleman" and trying to explain her affection saying "even Cinderella had her gigolo". The song also featured a clever rap verse also performed by Mary.

Chart status
Released in late 1981, the single generated initial buzz in early 1982 where the song became a smash on the dance floor eventually reaching #2 on the Billboard disco chart and #13 on the Hot Dance Club Play chart. It also crossed over to #69 on the R&B singles chart. Though the song wasn't a bigger hit as it was initially promoted to be, it motivated Wells to return to performing and recording full-time as she would until she was diagnosed with larynx cancer in 1990.

Personnel
Lead vocals by Mary Wells
Background vocals by Brenda Gooch, Lynda Laurence and Maxine Green
Rhythm Arrangements by Greg Perry & McKinley Jackson
Bass - Rodney Mizell
Horns - Fred Jackson, Jr., Ron Brown, George Bohanon, Nolan Smith Jr., Walter Johnson
Guitar - Dwight Caroll
Drums - Fonce Mizell
Percussion - Kenny Hudson
Keyboards & Synthesizer - Larry Mizell
Producers - Fonce & Larry Mizell

References

1981 singles
Mary Wells songs
Epic Records singles
Funk songs
Disco songs
Funk-rap songs
1981 songs
Song recordings produced by Mizell Brothers
Songs written by Alphonzo Mizell
Songs written by Larry Mizell